Sid Smith (12 September 1928 – 12 May 1985) was an Australian rules footballer who played for Geelong in the Victorian Football League during the early 1950s. 

Nicknamed 'Boots', Smith arrived at Geelong from Horsham and played in a premiership as a reserve in his debut season. The following year he played in another Grand Final, on a half back flank, but this time finished on the losing team. Such was the strength of the Geelong side during his time at the club that out of the 23 games that he played he was involved in only two losses.

Sid was not related to the Sid Smith who played for Geelong in 1911.

References

Holmesby, Russell and Main, Jim (2007). The Encyclopedia of AFL Footballers. 7th ed. Melbourne: Bas Publishing.

External links

1928 births
Australian rules footballers from Victoria (Australia)
Geelong Football Club players
Geelong Football Club Premiership players
Horsham Football Club players
1985 deaths
People educated at Geelong College
One-time VFL/AFL Premiership players